Rehana Ismail is a Pakistani politician who has been a member of the Provincial Assembly of Khyber Pakhtunkhwa since August 2018.

Education
She has a degree of master in Islamic Studies.

Political career
She was elected to the Provincial Assembly of Khyber Pakhtunkhwa as a candidate of Muttahida Majlis-e-Amal on a reserved seat for women in 2018 Pakistani general election.

References

Living people
Muttahida Majlis-e-Amal MPAs (Khyber Pakhtunkhwa)
Women members of the Provincial Assembly of Khyber Pakhtunkhwa
Year of birth missing (living people)